Syed Azlan Amjad (born 15 September 1996) is a Pakistani born Qatari professional squash player. As of February 2018, he was ranked number 142 in the world.

References

External links 
 

1996 births
Living people
Qatari male squash players
Squash players at the 2018 Asian Games
Asian Games competitors for Qatar